The Surinamese Football Association  is the governing body of football in Suriname. It organizes the Surinamese football league system, the Surinamese Cup, Suriname President's Cup, Suriname national football team, and the Suriname women's national football team. It is based in Paramaribo, and is a founding member of CONCACAF and a member of FIFA.

Just neighboring French Guiana and Guyana, Suriname are not members of the South American CONMEBOL confederation, but instead of CONCACAF, which covers North America, Central America, and the Caribbean.

History
Founded on 1 October 1920, the Surinamese Football Association was not the first official football association of Suriname, their main competitor as governing body of football in the country was the NGVB (Dutch Guyanese Football Association). Prior to the foundation in 1920 there was another governing body in Suriname by the same name, which was founded 1914. There was a lot of animosity between both associations, until president Emile de la Fuente settled their differences during the opening ceremony of the National Stadium.

With the foundation of the SVB, the development of football in the country reached new heights. It was better organized in accordance to the rules of the Dutch Football Association (NVB).

Some of those rules in the founding years included:
 A match lasts 2x25 minutes with a 5-minute break.
 There was a special committee of appointed referees.
 If the match is undecided after full-time, 10 extra minutes were awarded.

To develop a professional league in Suriname and to get the Surinamese people to support the league and national selection, the SVB signed a deal with Telecommunications Company of Suriname Telesur on 30 September 2016. In this deal Telesur's daughter company ATV has received the rights to broadcast all Surinamese matches live. In this deal ATV will also establish a program that will provide viewers with soccer news to keep them up to date with the SVB and the soccer in Suriname. This deal has been considered one of the best made so far by the SVB and will last 3 years.

Historical data and facts

 On 28 January 1921 the first International of the Suriname national team was contested against British Guiana, Suriname lost the match 1–2.
 On 5 August 1923 the first matches were played on the Cultuurtuinlaan.
 On 27 August 1923, the Suriname national team played their second International match against British Guiana and won 2–1.
 In 1924 the first official national competition was contested. Olympia won the first national title, while SV Transvaal won the Tweede Klasse that year.
 On 18 May 1929 Suriname became an official member of FIFA, the celebration was held on 7 June 1929.
 In 1934 the first official International match since joining FIFA was contested against Curaçao, with Suriname winning 3–1.
 In 1936 a Surinamese selection travelled to Brazil for the first time.
 The first Surinamese football club to travel abroad was S.V. Voorwaarts, who traveled to Saint-Laurent-du-Maroni, French Guiana winning the match 8–0.
 Bill Bromet was the first Surinamese referee to officiate an International match.
 At the 50-year Anniversary the SVB were granted permission by Queen Juliana of the Netherlands to add the 'Royal' predicate to the associations name.

Staff

Member associations
The SVB have several member associations (Dutch, Lidbonden) who are involved in the organization and facilitation of the sport throughout the different municipalities and districts of the country. Hosting their own independent amateur leagues, the winners of each member association participate in the Lidbondentoernooi which leads to promotion to the SVB Eerste Klasse. The presidents of each member association also receive a vote in the presidency seat of the Surinamese Football Association (SVB).

Current sponsorships
 Klupp
 Telesur
 Suribet
 Waldo's
 RB Enterprises
 TD
 IDOS
 TIMT
 Triple Double
 Gobler

References

External links
  Official website
 Suriname at the FIFA website
 Suriname at CONCACAF site
 

Suriname
Football in Suriname
Association football governing bodies in South America
Sports organizations established in 1920
1920 establishments in Suriname
Football Association